KJT or kjt may also refer to:

IATA code for Kertajati International Airport in northeastern West Java, Indonesia.
Katarina Johnson-Thompson an English track and field athlete